Garrick Lenin Littlewood (7 December 1940 – 25 July 2018) was a New Zealand judoka. He competed in the men's middleweight event at the 1972 Summer Olympics. Littlewood died in Auckland on 25 July 2018.

References

1940 births
2018 deaths
New Zealand male judoka
Olympic judoka of New Zealand
Judoka at the 1972 Summer Olympics
Sportspeople from Gisborne, New Zealand